Star Trek: ConQuest Online was an online digital collectible card game set in the Star Trek universe released in June 2000 for the Microsoft Windows by Activision.

Plot
Player assumes the role of a Q, an all-powerful being who is anxious to reign most clever amongst a bevy of other Qs. By utilizing collectible pieces from Star Trek: The Next Generation, the player manipulates the galaxy, hoping to outwit the competition and emerge victorious.

Player starts off with a predetermined set of pieces, constructed from a group of more than 150 characters, weapons, and ships, each with varying abilities and value. Player uses their pieces to gain control of the planets in their quadrant, as well as to attack and fend off their opponent's pieces. A player wins by seizing control of the challenger's home planet and capturing the Q or by holding off an opponent long enough to rack up the necessary points.

Reception

The game received "mixed" reviews according to the review aggregation website Metacritic.

References

External links
 

2000 video games
Activision games
Digital collectible card games
ConQuest Online
Windows games
Windows-only games
Video games developed in the United States